Euvarroa wongsirii is a species of bee mite native to Southeast Asia. It can be found in areas ranging from southern China to the Palawan Island of the Philippines and lives alongside Euvarroa sinhai a different bee mite species of the same genus Euvarroa . E. wongsirii is a parasite, which lives on bees, using them as a food source. This mite has been found almost exclusively in the bee Apis andreniformis in Thailand.

References

Fauna of Southeast Asia
Fauna of China
Parasites of bees